The M Countdown Chart is a record chart on the South Korean Mnet television music program M Countdown. Every week, the show awards the best-performing single on the chart in the country during its live broadcast.

In 2019, 36 singles ranked number one on the chart and 25 music acts were awarded first-place trophies. Two songs collected trophies for three weeks and achieved a triple crown: "Home" by Seventeen and "Flash" by X1. Of all releases for the year, only three songs earned a perfect score of 11,000 points: "Boy with Luv" by BTS, "Fancy" by Twice, and "Bet Bet" by NU'EST.

Scoring system 
Songs were judged based on a combination of digital music sales (45%), album sales (15%), social media performance (official YouTube music video views and SNS buzz: 20%), global fan votes (10%), Mnet's broadcast score (10%), and a live SMS vote (10%) that took place during the show.

Chart history

References 

2019 in South Korean music
South Korea M Countdown
Lists of number-one songs in South Korea